ASWH, short for Altijd Sterker Worden Hendrik-Ido-Ambacht, is an association football club from Hendrik-Ido-Ambacht, Netherlands. The club was founded in 1929. The club won section championships in 1949, 1959, 1961, 1970, 1883, 1999, 2001, 2002, and 2005. In 2005 it also won the Dutch Championship of Amateur Soccer and the Dutch Championship of Saturday Soccer. Ascending gradually through the ranks, ASWH played 2019–2022 in the semi-professional Tweede Divisie. In 2022, it returned to the Derde Divisie, the fourth tier of football in the Netherlands.

ASWH has won several cups: the KNVB Amateur Cup in 2006 and 2014, the District Cup South I in 2006, 2014, and 2016, and the Dutch Super Cup for Amateurs in 2005 and 2014. In the 2006–07 KNVB Cup, ASWH defeated the professional side Cambuur in the 16th finals, 4–2, before losing 5–0 against the professionals of Roda JC in the 8th finals. In the 2016–17 KNVB Cup it reached the 8th finals again, where it lost 2–0 against the professional AZ Alkmaar.

Club name 
The origin of the club's name is not clear. Some claim ASW stood for Altijd Sporten Wij (We're Always Sporting), others claim it meant Altijd Sterker Worden (Always Growing Stronger). Clueless which of the two is historically correct, club members eventually settled on "Altijd Sterker Worden" because of a general preference for this phrase as is. An H for Hendrik-Ido-Ambacht was later added as there were additional clubs with the name ASW.

History

1929–1939: Foundation, first years and CNVB 
The club was founded on August 1, 1929, as ASW, by five children from Hendrik-Ido-Ambacht: Bas van Wingerden (born 1915), Johannes van Wingerden (born 1917), Jan van Nieuwenhuyzen (born 1917), Siem van der Wulp (born 1919) and Harmen Haksteeg (born 1920). The oldest of the five, 14-year-old Bas van Wingerden, became the club's first chairman. He was succeeded by then 16-year-old Harmen Haksteeg in 1936. Haksteeg would remain chairman of the club until 1971.

The club initially played only friendly away-matches, for lack of its own ground, and could not join a competition. This changed when farmer Nugteren gave the club a pasture in 1936, coincidentally (as the club kept moving around) opposite the location of its current field. The first home match was played on May 25, 1936, against ULO Groenendijk. The club joined the Rotterdam district of the Christian Dutch Football Association, as a new club in its third and lowest class. On 2 November 1936 ASW lost in Rijsoord 3–1 against VV Rijsoord, the leaders of the competition and initially a stronger rival of ASW. With ASW central forward Pons missing, Van der Wulp scored an equalizer for H.I. Ambacht, yet the team and its keeper were no match for Rijsoord.

Starting in the 1937–38 season, the classes of the struggling CNVB were reorganized into regional sections. Henceforth ASW played in section C in the equivalent of a regional class 1, so it went supposedly up two tiers, while there was a stronger quality variance. In its first loss for this season,  ASWH was beaten 7–4 by VVE Nieuw Lekkerland, in what the Nieuwsblad voor de Hoeksche Waard en IJselmonde [sic] praised as "a match in which often good soccer could be enjoyed." On Monday, 6 June 1938 ASWH drew 1–1 against ONA Gouda and 0–0 against ZCFC Zaandam – the eventual winners of the 1B division cup – in the Western Tourneer of the Christian Dutch Football Association. In March 1939, ASW played again a strong game against VVE, going 1–0 into recession. In the second half VVE received and utilized a penalty shot. The supporters and players were annoyed by the decision, the referee by their protest, and decided with little reason to quit the game.

1939–1949: KNVB, WWII and a first championship 
In 1939–40, ASWH participated in an emergency competition. The competition was managed by the KNVB by standards set by the CNVB that had collapsed as the season was about to start. Initially, ASWH drew against Oranje Wit Dordrecht, 0–0. On 28 September 1940, "that brave little club" from Hendrik-Ido-Ambacht beat Rijsoord, 2–3, in Rijsoord. In November 1941, ASW led the regional Division B competition unbeaten, beating among others Dordrecht 3–1. In 1942 the Nazis confiscated the field of ASW after which it played on Ido's Football Club grounds on the Nieuwe Bosweg. The last game during World War II was a 1–5 loss against Kinderdijk-side VV De Zwerver in February 1944.

The first game after the war was a 3–0 loss against H.I.-Ambacht partner and rival IFC. Gradually an H for Hendrik-Ido-Ambacht was added to the club name, to avoid confusion with ASW from Dordrecht (merged into SC Reeland in 1997) and ASW from Waddinxveen (continuing under this name). The first section title for ASWH 1, in the highest division of the Dordrecht district of the Royal Dutch Football Association, was won in 1949, after winning all matches. The right for promotion posed a problem: the pitch didn't meet the criteria for admission to the main league system of the KNVB. A new ground on the Pruimendijk in Oostendam was offered by farmer Plaisier, and the club was promoted.

1949–1970: Vierde Klasse and Derde Klasse 

During almost the entire 1950s ASWH played in the Vierde Klasse 4C and 4D. It ended 9th in 1954, 8th in 1955 and '56, 7th in 1950, 4th in 1953 and '58, 3rd in 1951 and '57, and runner-up in 1952. In the runner-up year it was supposed to play an important game against Woudrichem, where the referee failed to show up. In 1959 it won the 4D section championship and promoted to the Derde Klasse.

The first gig in the Derde Klasse B lasted only one year and in the Summer of 1960 ASWH went back to the Vierde Klasse from position 9. For an equally short period as in 1961 ASWH secured its second Vierde Klasse section championship. In the decisive game, on Saturday 18 March 1961, it had beaten SV Bolnes 2–0 in Ambacht. ASWH thus promoted a second time to the Derde Klasse, this time staying for 2 seasons. In 1963 ASWH returned to the Vierde Klasse for two seasons.

In 1965 it was promoted from the second position in the Vierde Klasse, never to go to the Vierde again. Now a stable Derde Klasse team, it ended 8th in 1966, runner-up in 1967, 5th in 1968, and 6th in 1969.

1970–1996: Tweede Klasse and Eerste Klasse 
Slowly but steadily, ASWH rose through the ranks. In 1970 the Ambacht-side won its only Derde Klasse championship, after it beat RC Leiderdorp 2–0 at home. It promoted to the Tweede Klasse where it would play for the remainder of the 1970s and beyond.

In 1983, ASWH won its first and only Tweede Klasse championship. During the remainder of the 1980s, ASWH played in the Eerste Klasse. During the years 1992–1995 ASWH played back in the Tweede Klasse. In 1995 it was back in the Eerste Klasse.

1996–2016: Hoofdklasse and National Amateur Cup 

In 1996 ASWH was promoted from the Eerste Klasse to the Hoofdklasse, at that time the third tier and the highest tier of amateur football in the Netherlands. The club was relegated two years later, followed by the title in the Eerste Klasse and automatic promotion back to the Hoofdklasse.
The club was placed in the Saturday Hoofdklasse B, where it finished in third place. The next season brought the first Hoofdklasse title in the club's existence. In 2002 ASWH again won the title, this time in the Saturday Hoofdklasse A.

A third Hoofdklasse championship was earned in 2004–05, this time followed by the national title for Saturday amateurs, defeating IJsselmeervogels and Excelsior '31, and the national amateur title, defeating Mijdrecht-side SV Argon.

From Fall 2010 through Spring 2016 ASWH played continuously in Hoofdklasse B. In the 2015–2016 season, ASWH finished third in the Hoofdklasse. Through playoffs, it was promoted for the first time beyond the Hoofdklasse, to the newly coined Derde Divisie. In the 2016–17 KNVB Cup ASWH beat De Treffers 0–3 in Groesbeek in the first round. In the second round, it won 2–3 over SV Spakenburg in Spakenburg. In the third round it lost 2–0 against AZ Alkmaar in Alkmaar. While ASWH suffered a moderate loss and returned to Ambacht with dignified results against a leading professional team, AZ did not utilize several of its prime players. AZ eventually were runners-up in the national cup.

2016–2019: Derde Divisie 
ASWH started its first Derde Divisie season with a series of victories, eventually stopped at a 1–3 defeat against Heemskerk-side ODIN '59 on 25 September 2016. It was a sour loss as ASWH had not been beaten at Sportpark Schildman since November 2015 and controlled the ball 70% of the game. Regrouping soon enough, ASWH completed its first Derde Divisie season in 4th position.

In the 2017–18 KNVB Cup ASWH was out in its first game and second qualification round against Hoofdklasse-team HSV Hoek, when the Zeelanders beat ASWH 1–3 in Sportpark Schildman. ASWH 2 followed suit; it did not pass the classifying stage of the District Cup after it lost 3–1 against VV De Zwerver.

The second Derde Divisie season of ASWH started rather weak with defeats against FC Groningen (0–1), Quick Boys (0–1), and FC Volendam (0–5), draws against SV Spakenburg (2–2), DSV Ermelo (0–0), Jong Twente (2–2), VVOG Harderwijk (1–1), and VV Spijkenisse (0–0), and victories against Magreb Utrecht (2–5) and in a regional derby against VV Capelle (0–1). It finished the season in a disappointing 11th position, yet played good enough to remain in the Derde Divisie.

Since 2019 the youth department has been KNVB certified as a regional football academy.

ASWH strengthened throughout its third Derde Divisie season and on 25 May 2019 it secured the championship of the third period (season trimester), placing the club in the promotion playoff. After a 2-1 victory at Sportpark Schildman and 2-2 in Oostzaan, ASWH qualified for a playoff final against FC Lienden. In the finals, it lost the first game at Sportpark Schildman 0–1, then won 2–0 in Lienden, securing the promotion to the Tweede Divisie.

2019–2022: Tweede Divisie 
In its first game in the Tweede Divisie, ASWH drew against title candidate SV Spakenburg, 1–1. Sam van de Kreeke, who defeated FC Lienden with a second and last goal in the promotion finals, also scored the first goal in ASWH's new league. Next Saturday, ASWH was beaten 0–3 by VV Katwijk, another contender for the Tweede Divisie championship, and dropped from a shared 7th place to 15th position. In the third week, ASWH won its first Tweede Divisie game, 2–0 against SVV Scheveningen  through goals by Abderrahim Loukili and Clarence Bijl, rising to 11th position. In week 5, ASWH was badly beaten by VV Noordwijk, 5–1. Noordwijk promoted alongside ASWH to the Tweede Divisie. ASWH dropped to 14th position. A series of mostly defeats followed, bringing ASWH to the last spot on December 7, after losing 0–4 against HHC Hardenberg. After two draws against other bottom contenders, with a defeat in between, ASWH rose to the 17th spot on January 25. After an expected defeat on February 2 against IJsselmeervogels, 4–1, ASWH was dead last again. A home victory of ASWH on 8 February over GVVV brought the club to 17th position and brought fresh hope for remaining in the Tweede Divisie. On 29 February, after losing to Excelsior Maassluis, ASWH returned to the 18th last spot. It remained in the Tweede Dvisie as there were no relegations due to the COVID-19 pandemic in the Netherlands.

ASWH had a usually successful game preparation for its second Tweede Klasse Season that included a 1–0 victory against the 1st squad of the professional side FC Dordrecht. In its first league game against the strong Kozakken Boys in Werkendam, ASWH surprised with a narrow 2–3 loss, having reduced Kozakken's lead while ASWH played with only 10 players. In the third game it won as a visitor in Scheveningen from one goal, scored in the 21st second by Daniel Wissel. A 2–0 victory against De Treffers at home brought ASWH to second position, a 3–2 loss against AFC (after ASWH had led twice) to the fourth place, and a 2–0 victory over Quick Boys back to runner-up position, where it finished the season, due to the COVID-19 pandemic.

2022: Back in the Derde Divisie 
With an almost entirely new squad, ASWH started its preparations for a Derde Divisie season on 9 July 2022. It started the season on August 20, with an out victory against Harkemase Boys, 1–3.

Honors

Championships 
 Dutch Championship Amateur Soccer
 Champion in 2005
 Dutch Championship Saturday Soccer
 Champion in 2005
 Section championship
 Champion in 1949, 1959, 1961, 1970, 1883, 1999, 2001, 2002, 2005

Cups 
 KNVB Amateur Cup
 Winner in 2006, 2014
 District Cup South I
 Winner in 2006, 2014, 2016
 Dutch Super Cup for Amateurs
 Winner in 2005, 2014

Competition results

1929–1983

Since 1983

Players

Current squad

Youth players 
The following are youth players who received playing time in the official 2022–23 games of the first squad.

Player of the Year 

 1985–86: Wout Tims 
 1986–87: Aad van de Graaf 
 1987–88: Ruud Dorst
 1988–89: Tjesco de Goede 
 1989–90: Leo van Driel 
 1990–91: Martin Nouwen 
 1991–92: Leo van Driel 
 1992–93: Martin Nouwen
 1993–94: Marcel Dekker
 1994–95: Jan Scheurwater
 1995–96: Ruud Dorst
 1996–97: Michel Devilee
 1997–98: Willem Jan Barendregt
 1988–99: Willem Jan Barendregt
 1999–00: Ron Tempelaar
 2000–01: Michel Devilee
 2001–02: Michel Devilee
 2002–03: Johan Sturrus
 2003–04: Willem Jan Barendregt
 2004–05: Ferry van Lare
 2005–06: Willem Jan Barendregt
 2006-07: Arjan Human
 2007-08: Damiën Vereecken
 2008-09: Joshua Brard
 2009-10: Henk Roeland
 2010–11: Jordy van de Corput
 2011–12: Mels van Driel
 2012–13: Jordy van de Corput
 2013-14: Michael van Dommelen
 2014–15: Rutger de Bos
 2015–16: Mels van Driel
 2016–17: Jerry Tieleman
 2017–18: Stef Doedee
 2018–19: Gilmaro van de Werp

Top scorer of the first team 

 2014–15: Serginio van Axel-Dongen &Michael van Dommelen (13 goals each)
 2015–16: Michael van Dommelen (14)
 2016–17: Peter de Lange (20 goals)
 2017–18: Kyle Doesburg (13 goals)
 2018–19: Ismail Yildirim (14 goals)
 2019–20: Sam van de Kreeke (6 goals; season stopped)
 2020–21: Daniël Wissel (3 goals; season stopped)
 2021–22: Luuk Admiraal (8 goals; left in winter break)

Notable former players

International

Women 
 Nikki de Roest – after Heerjansdam and ASWH boys teams, played for RVVH and PSV/FC Eindhoven. Played on Netherlands U16 and U17. Now plays futsal.

Men 

 Arjan Human – played in ASWH 1 after RKC Waalwijk, ADO Den Haag, and Cercle Brugge
 Eric Abdul – played for DHC Delft, ASWH 1, SV Estrella, SV Dakota and the Aruba national football team
 Henrico Drost
 Ismaïl Yıldırım – played in ASWH after Kozakken Boys, RKC Waalwijk, Boluspor, and Menemen Belediyespor
 Jeffrey Altheer – played shortly in ASWH 1 after Feyenoord (bench only), Excelsior, Helmond, VVV, and Dutch national youth selections
 Ramon Hendriks
 Josimar Lima – played for ASWH after Willem II, Dordrecht, Al-Shaab, FC Emmen, FC Lahti, VVV, Netherlands U19, and Cape Verde national team
 Kenny Anderson – Played in ASWH 1 after RKC Waalwijk, Heart of Midlothian, and Quick Boys
 Marten de Roon – after ASWH youth, played for Feyenoord, Sparta Rotterdam, SC Heerenveen, Atalanta B.C., Middlesbrough F.C. and the Dutch national team
 Nixon Dias – played in Sparta Rotterdam, ADO Den Haag and Netherlands U-19, ASWH 1 and Dayton Dutch Lions FC
 Quentin Jakoba – joined ASWH 1 after FC Eindhoven and Kozakken Boys. Later in Curacao national football team
 Raymond de Waard – before ASWH 1 played for Excelsior Rotterdam, Norwich City, AZ Alkmaar, and RBC Roosendaal
 Robin Schmidt – after ASWH youth teams, played for Sparta Rotterdam, FC Twente, FC Dordrecht, and SuS Stadtlohn
 Silvino Soares – played for ASWH 1 after FC Zwolle, KV Red Star Waasland and the Cape Verde national football team
 Stef Doedee – played in Feyenoord, RKC Waalwijk, FC Dordrecht and FC Inter Turku before ASWH
 Stefan van Dam – played in ASWH 1 and the national amateur section after Willem II and TOP Oss.
 Shabir Isoufi – played for Feyenoord, Excelsior, FC Dordrecht, Telstar, and Barendrecht, then in ASWH 1 and the national team of Afghanistan
 Yuri Petrov – before ASWH 1 played for Spartak Moscow, Lokomotiv Moscow, Waalwijk, Twente, Den Haag, Metalist Kharkiv, and Volendam

Nationals 

 Carlos Ramos – played in ASWH 1 after RBC Roosendaal, SC Feyenoord, and Kozakken Boys
 Jacob van den Belt – played in ASWH 1 after RBC Roosendaal, VVV-Venlo, and DOTO
 Jordie van der Laan – on loan from Kozakken Boys after playing professional football at SC Telstar
 Joshua Brard – after playing in ASWH youth teams, played for Sparta Rotterdam (bench only), FC Oss and LRC Leerdam, before playing in ASWH 1
 Koen Wesdorp – played in ASWH after RBC Roosendaal, NAC Breda, Willem II, and Helmond Sport
 Leon van Dalen – played in ASWH 1 after FC Dordrecht (1988–2003) and TOP Oss (2003–2008)
 Luuk Admiraal – after playing in ASWH1, this striker continued to SBV Excelsior
 Mels van Driel – played 9 years in ASWH 1 after Excelsior, Fortuna Sittard and RBC Roosendaal

 Ramon Hendriks - played in ASWH youth teams, before moving to FC Dordrecht and later on Feyenoord. Hendriks also played for NAC Breda in de Keuken Kampioen Divisie.

Staff

Head coach 
 Henk Zwang (1950–1954)
 Janus van der Gijp (1954)
 Floor de Zeeuw (1954–1958)
 Cor Scheurwater (1958–1962)
 Piet Confurius (1962–1963)
 Cor Scheurwater (1963–1964)
 Cees de Jong (1964–1967)
 Theo Smit (1967–1968)

 Ad de Bondt (1968–1973)
 Gerrit Wijngaard (1973–1975)
 Leo van Graafeiland (1975–1978)
 Roon Schleurholtz-Boerma (1978–1979)
 Henk van Osch (1979–1984)
 Cees van de Bosch (1984–1986)
 Gerard Weber (1986–1988)
 Cees van de Bosch (ad interim, 1988)
 Arnold Lobman (1988–1991)
 René Vermunt (1991–1993)
 Arie van der Zouwen (1993–1997)
 Arie Romijn (1997–1998)
 Hans Maus (1998–2000)
 André Wetzel (2000–2001)
 Jack van den Berg (2001–2006)
 Bill Tukker (2006–2008)
 Henk Wisman (ad interim, 2008)
 Dogan Corneille (ad interim, 2008)
 Willem Leushuis (2008–2010)
 Fop Gouman (2010–2011)
 Ron Timmers (2011–2013)
 Michel Langerak (2013–2015)
 Joop Hiele (ad interim, 2015)
 Jack van den Berg (2015–2018)
 Cesco Agterberg (2018–2019)
 Rogier Veenstra (2019–2022)
 Sjoerd van der Waal (2022–)

Goalkeeping coach 
 Wim Berends (within the 2000s)
 Joop Hiele (2012–2015)
 John Bos (2015–)

Assistant coach
 Ad de Bondt (within the 1980s)
 Ab Ritmeester (within the 1980s)
 Ton Stam (within the 2000s)
 Theo Smit (2006–2008)
 Dogan Corneille (2008–2009)
 Jeroen Rijsdijk (2009–2010)
 Theo Smit (2011–2013)
 Ed Ridderhof (2013–2015)
 Johan Sturrus (2015–2018)
 Ferry van Lare (2017–2018)
 Ed Ridderhof (2018–2019)
 Sjoerd van der Waal (2019–2022)
 Stefan van Dam (2022–)
 Michael van Dommelen (2nd asst, 2022–)

Technical manager 
(this senior position is not always occupied)
 Wim Helmink (into the 2000s)
 Michel Devilee (one year in the 2000s)
 Mels van Driel (2020–)

Chairperson 
 Bas van Wingerden (1929–1936)
 Harmen Haksteeg (1936–1939)
 Maarten Terlouw (1940–1942)
 Harmen Haksteeg (1942–1971)
 Frans van Son (1971–1979)
 Ger van der Straaten (1979–1981)
 Kees Zwijnenberg (1981–1886)
 John van Spronsen (1986–1992)
 Cor Scheurwater (1992–1998)
 Leo van den Berg (1998–2002)
 John Middendorp (2002–2014)
 Herman Jonker (2015–2018)
 John Middendorp (2019–)

Honorary members
 
 Cor Scheurwater (1997)
 Wim Helmink (2008)
 John Middendorp (2014)
 Gerrit Scheurwater (2014)

Derbies
The name derby is always added to games against the older football club from Hendrik Ido Ambacht, Ido's Football Club, and often also to games against other clubs from the (greater) region, such as Kozakken Boys, VV Capelle, VV Heerjansdam, Excelsior Maassluis, RVVH Ridderkerk, VV Rijsoord, VV Spijkenisse, Stedoco Hoornaar, Sparta Rotterdam and Pelikaan Zwijndrecht.

Kit manufacturers and shirt sponsors

References

 
Football clubs in the Netherlands
Football clubs in Hendrik-Ido-Ambacht
1929 establishments in the Netherlands
Association football clubs established in 1929